"Fade Out Lines" is a song by French producer The Avener. It is a deep house rework of "The Fade Out Line", an original song by Australian band Phoebe Killdeer & the Short Straws from their 2011 album Innerquake. It was written by Phoebe Killdeer, composed by Cédric Le Roux and Archive singer Craig Walker, and produced by The Avener. First released in October 2013 through French independent label 96 Musique, it became a chart hit in 2014, entering the French singles chart in April 2014 and ultimately reaching number three in November, and debuting at number one on the German singles chart in October. It went on to serve as the lead single from his self-titled American EP (2015), and his debut album The Wanderings of the Avener (2015).

Music video
The official music video made for the original song directed by Mark Nava was released onto Youtube on 1 April 2013. music video to accompany the release of "Fade Out Lines" featuring Fleur Geffrier was first released onto YouTube on 20 October 2014.

Track listing

Charts

Weekly charts

Year-end charts

Certifications

Release history

Use in media
The song was used in the German Movie Ostwind 2 (a sequel to Windstorm) from 2015.

In June 2017, the song was used in a Peugeot 208 TV advertisement that was broadcast in Portugal.

In June 2019, the original version "Fade Out Line" was featured in the ending credits of season 2, episode 1 of HBO's Big Little Lies.

References

2014 singles
2014 songs
Capitol Records singles
Number-one singles in Austria
Number-one singles in Germany